Judges who have served on the Federal Court of Australia , are appointed in accordance with section 72 of the Constitution, which has, since the Court's inception in 1976, been for a term expiring at age 70.

In addition to their judicial service, six judges of the Federal Court have also been elected to the Parliament of Australia: Nigel Bowen, Bob Ellicott, Merv Everett, Tony Whitlam, John Reeves and Duncan Kerr. All were elected prior to their appointment to the bench.

Additionally, two judges of the Federal Court have served in state Parliaments: Bernard Riley, formerly of the New South Wales Legislative Council, and Howard Olney, formerly of the Western Australian Legislative Council.

Judges including Chief Justices

Location of current judges

Sydney

Melbourne

Brisbane

Perth

Adelaide

Hobart
  (24 January 2022)

See also
 Judiciary of Australia
Federal Court Judges holding concurrent appointments in:
 List of judges of the Federal Court of Bankruptcy
 List of judges of the Industrial Relations Court of Australia
 List of judges of the Supreme Court of the Australian Capital Territory
 List of judges of the Supreme Court of Christmas Island
 List of judges of the Supreme Court of the Cocos (Keeling) Islands
 List of judges of the Supreme Court of Norfolk Island

References
 
Federal Court of Australia
Federal